Nguyễn Phúc Chu (1675 – 1 June 1725) was one of the Nguyễn lords who ruled southern Vietnam (Dang Trong) from 1691 to 1725.
During his time in power, he had to deal with a Champa rebellion and the first major war against the Cambodians. Nguyễn Phúc Chu was the eldest son of Nguyễn Phúc Trăn. He gained the throne on his father's early death, at just 15 years old. He took for himself the title Tong Quan-Cong (Duke of Tong). 

Early in his reign the Champa ruler of Panduranga (in present-day Ninh Thuận), Po Sot, began a rebellion against the Nguyễn. The revolt was at first unsuccessful and after the Nguyễn army put down the revolt there was an outbreak of plague in Panduranga. Three years later, a Cham aristocrat, Oknha Dat, obtained the help of General A Ban (a somewhat mysterious figure). 

Together they defeated a Nguyễn military force in 1695. The new Cham king, Po Saktiray Da Patih (younger brother of Po Sot), made a treaty with Nguyễn Phúc Chu. The result was the Cham rulers in Panduranga were recognised as Trấn Vương (local lords) for the next 135 years, though they had no authority over Vietnamese living in the area. In 1714, Nguyễn Phúc Chu sent an army into Cambodia to support Keo Fa who claimed the throne against Prea Srey Thomea (see also the article on the Post-Angkor Period). The army of Siam also got involved in the war, the Siamese sided with the Prea Srey Thomea against the Vietnamese (this was during the time of the Ayutthaya Kings of Siam). The Vietnamese won several battles against the Siamese (including the battle of Banteay Meas) but shifting fortunes led to the war ending with negotiations rather than military defeat on either side.

Last years
In 1720, near the end of his reign, Nguyễn Phúc Chu, took formal control over the last lands of the Champa. Whether this was a violation of the peace treaty he signed with the Cham 25 years earlier is not known. On 1 June 1725, Nguyễn Phúc Chu died and was succeeded by his second son, Nguyễn Phúc Trú.

See also
 Lê dynasty
 List of Vietnamese dynasties

Sources

 Encyclopedia of Asian History, Volume 3 (Nguyen Lords) 1988. Charles Scribner's Sons, New York. 
 The Encyclopedia of Military History by R. Ernest Dupuy and Trevor N. Dupuy. Harper & Row (New York). 
 Vietnam, Trials and Tribulations of a Nation by D. R. SarDesai, ppg 33–34, 1988 

Chu
1675 births
1725 deaths
17th-century Vietnamese people
18th-century Vietnamese people